Gutter is a song by Danish singer Medina from her international debut studio album Welcome to Medina. It was released as the fourth single from the album on March 4, 2011. The electropop song was written by Medina, Providers and Viktoria Siff Emilie Hansen and it was produced by Providers. "Gutter" peaked at number eight in Denmark.

Track listing
Danish digital download
 "Gutter" – 3:25

Danish digital download — remixes
 "Gutter" (Svenstrup & Vendelboe Remix) – 5:55
 "Gutter" (Blank & Jones Club Mix) – 6:45
 "Gutter" (Blank & Jones Dub Mix) – 6:29
 "Gutter" (Blank & Jones Radio Edit) – 3:37

Austrian/German/Swiss digital download
 "Gutter" – 3:25
 "Gutter" (Blank & Jones Club Mix) – 6:45
 "Gutter" (Blank & Jones Radio Edit) – 3:37
 "Gutter" (Blank & Jones Dub Mix) – 6:29
 "Gutter" (Gabriel Schwarz Remix) – 3:29
 "Gutter" (Svenstrup & Vendelboe Remix) – 5:55

Austrian/German/Swiss CD single
 "Gutter" – 3:24
 "Gutter" (Blank & Jones Club Mix) – 6:45

US digital download
 "Gutter" – 3:25
 "Gutter" (Svenstrup & Vendelboe Remix) – 5:55
 "Gutter" (Blank & Jones Radio Edit) – 3:37
 "Gutter" (Blank & Jones Club Mix) – 6:45
 "Gutter" (Blank & Jones Dub Mix) – 6:29

Charts

Release history

References

External links
 

2011 singles
Danish dance-pop songs
Synth-pop ballads
Medina (singer) songs
Songs written by Rasmus Stabell
Songs written by Jeppe Federspiel
2011 songs
Songs written by Viktoria Hansen
Songs written by Medina (singer)